13 & God is the first studio album by 13 & God, a collaboration between American hip hop group Themselves and German rock band The Notwist. It was released on Anticon and Alien Transistor in 2005. "Men of Station / Soft Atlas" was released as a single from the album.

Critical reception

At Metacritic, which assigns a weighted average score out of 100 to reviews from mainstream critics, the album received an average score of 80, based on 20 reviews, indicating "generally favorable reviews".

Tim DiGravina of AllMusic gave the album 4 stars out of 5, describing it as "a decidedly dark and murky musical excursion into a realm of percolating electronics, moody jazz elements, bizarre raps, ethereal acoustic guitars, and sad pianos." He added: "While there's a sense that both artists went a bit too heavy on dark atmosphere, given that both usually inject more whimsy into their creations, 13 & God is still a consistently intriguing, frequently beautiful experiment that offers ample rewards with each new listen." Melissa Wheeler of Exclaim! called it "a gorgeous, pensive and gently dark album of rap-sprinkled mutated electronic indie rock". Adrien Begrand of PopMatters gave the album 7 stars out of 10, stating: "It's an album that requires patience from both hip-hop devotees and IDM enthusiasts, but once it's allowed to grow on the listener, its own distinct beauty begins to surface with each subsequent listen."

Track listing

Personnel
Credits adapted from liner notes.

13 & God
 Adam "Doseone" Drucker – vocals, sampler, synthesizer, melodica, field recording
 Jeff "Jel" Logan – vocals, sampler, turntables, drums
 Dax Pierson – vocals, piano, electric piano, melodica, organ, synthesizer, sampler, mouth percussion, bike party recording
 Markus Acher – vocals, guitar, banjo, keyboards, plugged piano, sampler, turntables, programming
 Micha Acher – bass guitar, keyboards, piano, trombone, programming, electronics, string arrangement, brass arrangement
 Martin Gretschmann – electronics, synthesizer, effects, processing, programming

Additional musicians
 Ulrich Wangenheim – clarinet (1, 5), flute (1, 5)
 Valerie Trebeljahr – vocals (1, 5, 6)
 Stefanie Bohm – vocals (3, 5, 6)
 Martin Messerschmid – drums (3, 10)
 Max Punktezahl – guitar (4, 10), delay (4, 10)
 Yoni Wolf – vocals (6)
 James Brandon Best – vocals (8)
 Sebastian Hess – cello (9)
 Flo Steinleitner – everything else
 God – afterclap

Technical personnel
 Martin Gretschmann – mixing
 Chris Blair – mastering

References

External links
 
 

2005 debut albums
13 & God albums
Anticon albums